Franz Resch (born 4 May 1969) is a retired Austrian football player and a football manager currently managing FC Lauterach.

External links

1969 births
Living people
Austrian footballers
Austria international footballers
Austrian football managers
SK Rapid Wien players
FC Admira Wacker Mödling players
FK Austria Wien players
Motherwell F.C. players
Darlington F.C. players
FC Lustenau players
Austrian Football Bundesliga players
Scottish Football League players

Association football defenders